Kannitheevu is a 1981 Indian Tamil-language action thriller film, directed by T. R. Ramanna and produced by Sri Ayvar Arts films. The film stars Jaishankar, Raadhika , C. L. Anandan, Seema. It was released on 10 April 1981.

Plot

Cast 
 Jaishankar as Pandiyan
 Raadhika as Selvi
 Seema as Rani
 C. L. Anandan as Albert
 Vennira Aadai Moorthy as Kannan
 Ranjeet as Kali
 Kumar Raja as Simon
R. N. Sudarshan as Scientist Arun
 Ennatha Kannaiya as Rajarathnam
 Isari Velan as Rathnavel
 Vijayachandrika
M.B. Shetty 
Jayashree T as Dancer

Soundtrack 
The songs were written by Panchu Arunachalam and music composed by Ilaiyaraaja.

References

External links 

 

1980s spy thriller films
1981 action thriller films
1981 films
Films directed by T. R. Ramanna
Films scored by Ilaiyaraaja
Indian action thriller films
Indian spy thriller films